Khangaon or Khanagaon may refer to any of the following villages in India:

 Khangaon, Madhubani district,  Bihar
 Khangaon, Bhojpur district, Bihar
 Khangaon, Khargone district, Madhya Pradesh
 Khangaon, Wardha district, Maharastra
 Khangaon, Katol tehsil, Nagpur district, Maharastra
 Khangaon, Kalameshwar tehsil, Nagpur district, Maharastra
 Khangaon, Savner tehsil, Nagpur district, Maharastra
 Khangaon, Chandrapur district, Maharastra
 Khangaon, Yavatmal district, Maharastra
 Khangaon Najik, Nashik district, Maharastra
 Khangaon Thadi, Nashik district, Maharastra
 Khangaon, Kota district, Rajasthan
 Khanagaon, Belagavi district, Karnataka
 Khanagaon (K.H.), Belagavi district, Karnataka
 Khanagaon (B.K.), Belagavi district, Karnataka